Binh Danh (born October 9, 1977) is a Vietnamese-born photographer and artist. He immigrated with his parents to the United States in 1979.

Danh was educated at San José State University and in 2002, studied Asian American studies and achieved a Bachelor of Fine Arts in photography. At the age of 25, Danh was one of the youngest artists to be invited into Stanford University's Master of Fine Arts program. He accepted this invitation and at Stanford, he studied the subject of studio art for his Master's.

Danh's art focuses predominately on the Vietnam War era and he has been quoted as saying that a lot of his work is involved with the theme of death. Danh has also said that the photographs he uses "bring up and start to fabricate memories" of his life in Vietnam. His images were described as being able to "summon up revulsion over present violent conflicts in the world without direct topical reference"
 and a critic said that his images of war scenes "evoked wars past and present with an unforced economy almost unparalleled in political art."

Technique
Danh uses a specific organic technique of his own invention to create his art, the style of which is referred as chlorophyll print. This process begins with choosing a suitable leaf; Danh prefers to use leaves from his mother's garden. Positives of photographs are placed onto leaves, and then covered with glass to be exposed to sunlight for a period of days. If Danh is satisfied with the finished piece, it will be encapsulated permanently by being cast in a solid block of resin. Danh has articulated that throughout his education he has been "very attracted to art, history, and science" and that the processes used in his work represent his "interest in the sciences and photographic techniques." Danh has also stated that the history he searches for "are the hidden stories embedded in the landscape around" him that chlorophyll prints "capture his belief in the interconnectedness of the natural world."

Notable works
"Life: Dead", a series of framed, withered leaves imprinted with images of dead soldiers, was created using photographs of American soldiers who died between May 28 and June 3, 1969, the images of which were taken from an issue of Life magazine titled "One Week's Dead", and then were digitally rendered into a negative print.

To create "Searching for the Cosmos", Danh used images downloaded from the Internet of the night sky, the negative of which were overlaid on individual leaves. The shadows of the negatives meant that the leaves were deprived of light. On one particular veined, almond-shaped leaf, named "Night Sky", this interruption in photosynthesis resulted in an image that was described as being "like the starry heavens."

To accompany an ofrenda, or offering, he produced for the Oakland Museum show in 2003, which combined photographs of the dead, candles, incense and a statue of the Buddha. Danh commented on his own culture's observance of death, "I come from a Vietnamese Buddhist background, so in my house there are many altars dedicated to many deceased relatives."

Individual exhibitions
2004 - Human / Nature at the Haines Gallery, San Francisco, CA
2005 - Binh Danh’s Photographic Works, Mohr Gallery, Finn Center, Community School of Arts & Music, Mountain View, CA
2006 - Ancestral Altars, Haines Gallery, San Francisco, CA
2007 - Botanical Stories Sanchez Art Center, Pacifica, CA
2007 - One Week’s Dead, Light Work, Syracuse, New York
2007 - Jungle of Memories, Chico State University, Chico, CA
2007 - The Botany of Tuol Sleng at the Lisa Sette Gallery, Scottsdale, AZ
2008 - Life, Times, and Matter of the Swamp at the Mary Elizabeth Dee Shaw Gallery, Weber State University, Ogden, UT
2008 - Life: Dead at the Clara Hatton Gallery, Colorado State University, Fort Collins, CO
2009 - In the Eclipse of Angkor at the Lisa Sette Gallery, Scottsdale, AZ
2009 - In the Eclipse of Angkor at the Eleanor D. Wilson Museum, Hollins University, Roanoke, VA
2010 - Memory to Memory at the Lisa Sette Gallery, Scottsdale, AZ
2010 - Binh Danh: Collecting Memories Mills College Art Museum, CA
2010 - Binh Danh: In the Eclipse of Angkor North Carolina Museum of Art

Collective exhibitions

Collections
Corcoran Gallery of Art, Washington, D.C.
M.H. de Young Museum, San Francisco, CA
Museum of Contemporary Photography, Columbia College, Chicago, IL
Oakland Museum of California, Oakland, CA
Rochester Memorial Art Gallery, Rochester, NY
University of California, Santa Cruz’s Special Collection
Eleanor D. Wilson Museum, Hollins University, Roanoke, VA
North Carolina Museum of Art, Raleigh, NC
Philadelphia Museum of Art, Philadelphia, PA

Awards
1996 - Bank of America Achievement Award in the Field of Fine Arts, Plaque Winner, San Jose, CA
1996 - Montalvo Award of Merit, Villa Montalvo, CA
2000 - Lottery Grant, San Jose State University, San Jose, CA
2001 - Individual Grant, Belle Foundation, San Jose, CA
2004 - Artist Project Award, The Center for Photographic Art, Carmel, CA
2007 - Visions from the New California Award, Alliance of Artists Communities, Providence, RI

References

External links

Archival collections
 Guide to the Binh Danh photographs from the Pulau Bidong Series. Special Collections and Archives, The UC Irvine Libraries, Irvine, California.

1977 births
Living people
American photographers
Artists from the San Francisco Bay Area
San Jose State University alumni
Stanford University alumni
Vietnamese emigrants to the United States